Vilashahr or Vīlā Shahr (Persian: ويلاشهر) is a small town in Iran, located in the rural area of Isfahan (city) and in 5 Kilometre distance of Najafabad.

Populated places in Isfahan Province